"Best Friend" is a song by Danish group Toy-Box from their debut studio album, Fantastic (1999). It was released as the second single from the album in 1998 in Germany.

Track listing
UK & Europe CD-Single
"Best Friend" (Radio Version) – 3:28 	
"Best Friend" (Maxi Version) – 4:11 	

Scandinavia CD Maxi-Single, Promo
"Best Friend" (Kaydee Vs. DJ NME) – 6:48 	
"Best Friend" (Hampenberg Club Edit) – 5:25 	
"Best Friend" (Elephant & Castle Mix) – 5:05
"Best Friend" (The Poker Boys Toy-Mix Long Version) – 6:28 	

Australia  CD Maxi-Single
"Best Friend" (Radio Version) – 3:28 	
"Best Friend" (Maxi Version) – 4:11 	
"Best Friend" (The Poker Boys Toy-Mix Long Version) – 6:28 	
"Best Friend" (The Poker Boys Toy-Mix Short Version) – 3:12 	
"Best Friend" (Elephant & Castle Mix) – 5:05

Germany CD Maxi-Single
"Best Friend" (Radio Version) – 3:28 	
"Best Friend" (The Poker Boys Toy-Mix Long Version) – 6:28 	
"Best Friend" (Elephant & Castle Mix) – 5:05

UK Cassette, Single
"Best Friend" (Radio Version) – 3:28 	
"Best Friend" (The Poker Boys Toy-Mix Long Version) – 6:28 	
"Best Friend" (Radio Version) – 3:28 	
"Best Friend" (The Poker Boys Toy-Mix Long Version) – 6:28

Charts

Weekly charts

Year-end charts

References

1998 singles
1999 singles
1998 songs
Toy-Box songs
Dutch Top 40 number-one singles
Edel AG singles
Mega Records singles
Victor Entertainment singles
Songs about friendship